The Oregon Trail School District is a public school district in the U.S. state of Oregon. It spans  from the outskirts of the city of Gresham to the top of Mount Hood, on the Oregon Trail. It encompasses several distinct, mostly unincorporated, rural areas of Clackamas County, including the communities along the Mount Hood Corridor, Boring, and the city of Sandy. The district serves approximately 4,200 students. There are five elementary schools, three middle schools, Oregon Trail Academy, a K-12 IB charter school, and one high school, Sandy High School.

The district was formed in 1997 by the merger of several previously separate districts: the Bull Run, Boring, Cottrell, Sandy Elementary, Sandy Union High, and Welches School Districts.

See also
List of school districts in Oregon

References

External links

School districts in Oregon
Education in Clackamas County, Oregon
1997 establishments in Oregon
School districts established in 1997